Beckett End is a village in Norfolk, England. The population is included in the civil parish of Foulden.

References

Villages in Norfolk